The Banu thabit dynasty was a tribe of Arab descent that established an Emirate in modern-day Libya in 1320. They were able to develop a strong military and navy that allowed them to conquer neighboring territories. One such conquest was the island of Djerba, which they captured in 1331 after a four-year siege, taking advantage of a rebellion against the Hafsids by Ibn Al Dabous, the ruler of Djerba.

Despite their military successes, Banu thabit were not immune to external threats. They faced attacks from Genoese and Crown of Aragon corsairs and were vulnerable to invasions. The Battle of Tlemcen in 1330 saw them triumph over Genoa, but the threat from Aragon remained. Nevertheless, the Emirate managed to establish peaceful relations with the Republic of Venice and experienced economic growth.

However, the Black Death took a toll on their military and economy, leading to their defeat at the hands of the Republic of Genoa, who captured the city. Banu thabit fled to Egypt while the Banu Makki established their rule in Gabès for 17 years. Banu thabit eventually returned and retook the city.

The dynasty's fall came in 1406 when the Hafsid Sultan declared war and led a campaign of over 20 thousand men, capturing Tripoli and ending Banu thabit rule.

References

Tribes of Libya